Junior Antony Bent (born 1 March 1970) is an English former professional footballer who played as a winger in the Football League for Huddersfield Town, Burnley, Bristol City, Stoke City, Shrewsbury Town and Blackpool.

Bent began his career with his hometown club Huddersfield Town playing in 44 matches and spending time on loan at Burnley before joining Bristol City in 1990. He became a regular at Ashton Gate and went on to stay for seven years making 221 appearances including short loan spells with Stoke City and Shrewsbury Town. He left Bristol City in 1997 and joined Blackpool where he stayed for three seasons before entering non-league football with Kettering Town and Lancaster City.

Career
Bent began his career as a trainee at Huddersfield Town, his hometown club, making his debut in 1987. He made 36 league appearances and scored six goals for the Terriers. During the 1989–90 season, he had a loan spell at Fourth Division side Burnley, with striker Brendan O'Connell moving in the opposite direction on a similar deal. Bent made his first appearance for Burnley on 2 December 1989 in the 1–1 draw with Grimsby Town. He went on to score three times in nine matches for the Lancashire club, including two goals in the 3–0 home win over Scarborough on 9 January 1990.

In March 1990, Bent transferred to Bristol City for a £30,000 fee. He spent seven years at Ashton Gate, making almost 200 appearances and scoring 20 goals, including a last-minute winner in a League Cup tie at Bristol Rovers in his final match for the club. After loan spells at Stoke City, where he played just once, away at Torquay United he went on loan again to Shrewsbury Town, in 1992 and 1996 respectively, Bent signed for Blackpool in 1997 for a nominal fee. In four years at Bloomfield Road he made just over 100 appearances and found the net on five occasions. He was released in 2001, and finished his career with brief spells at non-league clubs Kettering Town and, after a year out of the game, Lancaster City.

Post retirement
Bent now coaches at Preston North End. He is the Under 15s Coach.

Personal life
Born in England, Bent is of Jamaican descent. He is a  relative of the footballer Darren Bent. Bent's son Cory is also a professional footballer and plays in Canada for HFX Wanderers.

Career statistics
Source:

A.  The "Other" column constitutes appearances and goals in the Anglo-Italian Cup, Football League play-offs and Football League Trophy.

References

External links
 
 

1970 births
Footballers from Huddersfield
Living people
English footballers
English sportspeople of Jamaican descent
Association football forwards
Huddersfield Town A.F.C. players
Burnley F.C. players
Bristol City F.C. players
Stoke City F.C. players
Shrewsbury Town F.C. players
Blackpool F.C. players
Kettering Town F.C. players
Lancaster City F.C. players
English Football League players
Preston North End F.C. non-playing staff